5-exo-hydroxycamphor dehydrogenase (F-dehydrogenase, FdeH) is an enzyme with systematic name 5-exo-hydroxycamphor:NAD+ oxidoreductase. This enzyme catalyses the following chemical reaction

 5-exo-hydroxycamphor + NAD+  bornane-2,5-dione + NADH + H+

This enzyme contains Zn2+. It is isolated from Pseudomonas putida.

References

External links 
 

EC 1.1.1